Santana Cycles is the world's leading manufacturer of tandem bicycles. Santana was founded in 1976 by Bill McCready, an Associate Editor at Bicycling Magazine, and is located in La Verne, California. In the 1970s "Santana virtually re-invented the tandem, which had been in decline since the second world war." In 2002, Santana was described as the largest manufacturer of "enthusiast level" tandem bicycles.

See also 
 List of bicycle brands and manufacturing companies
 Outline of cycling

References

External links
Santana Cycles website

Cycle manufacturers of the United States
La Verne, California
Companies based in Los Angeles County, California